Calvin Onderdonk Schofield Jr., (born January 6, 1933), the second Bishop of the Episcopal Diocese of Southeast Florida, was born in 1933, in Delhi, New York, the son of Calvin O. Schofield and his wife, Mabel Ellen Schofield.  He is a member of the Onderdonk family of New York which produced two 19th-century bishops, Henry Ustick Onderdonk in the Episcopal Diocese of Pennsylvania and Benjamin Treadwell Onderdonk in  the Episcopal Diocese of New York.

Education
Schofield attended Hobart College and received a B.A. in 1959. He studied theology at the Berkeley Divinity School at Yale University and received an M.Div. in 1962.

Honorary degrees
Schofield has received the following honorary degrees:
 1979, D.D., Berkley Divinity School at Yale University;
 1980, S.T.D., Hobart College;
 1984, D.D., University of the South, Sewanee, Tennessee.

Ministry
Schofield was ordained to the diaconate June 30, 1962,  and to the priesthood December 31, 1962.  He served as curate of St. Peter's Episcopal Church, now Cathedral, St. Petersburg, Florida, from 1962–1964, when he left to become vicar of St. Andrew's Episcopal Church, in Miami, Florida, where he stayed until he was elected bishop coadjutor of the Episcopal Diocese of South Florida and was consecrated on March 23, 1979. On January 1, 1980, he became the second bishop of Southeast Florida and served until his retirement in 2000. He also served as a chaplain in the United States Navy Reserve 1962-1985.

Family
Schofield married  Elaine Fullerton on August 3, 1963, and they have two children.  In their retirement, the Schofields enjoy skiing in Colorado and sailing in Florida. Bishop Schofield still finds time to perform episcopal functions such as confirmations and ordinations.

References

External links

 The Diocese of Southeast Florida
 History of the Diocese of Southeast Florida
 St. Peter's Cathedral, St. Petersburg, Florida

Living people
1933 births
Berkeley Divinity School alumni
Episcopal bishops of Southeast Florida